The Statute Law Revision Act 1892 (55 & 56 Vict c 19) is an Act of the Parliament of the United Kingdom. The Bill for this Act was the Statute Law Revision Bill 1892.

This Act was repealed for the United Kingdom by Group 1 of Part IX of Schedule 1 to the Statute Law (Repeals) Act 1998.

The enactments which were repealed (whether for the whole or any part of the United Kingdom) by this Act were repealed so far as they extended to the Isle of Man on 25 July 1991.

This Act was retained for the Republic of Ireland by section 2(2)(a) of, and Part 4 of Schedule 1 to, the Statute Law Revision Act 2007.

Section 3 of the Statute Law Revision (No. 2) Act 1893 provided that the Second Schedule to that Act was to be substituted for so much of this Act as related to the Cambridge University Act 1856.

Section 3 of the Statute Law Revision Act 1894 provided that the Second Schedule to that Act was to be substituted for so much of this Act and of the Statute Law Revision (No. 2) Act 1888 as related to the Small Debt (Scotland) Act 1837 and to the 4 & 5 Vict c 10, and that "the said Statute Law Revision Acts" were to be read and construed accordingly.

As to the effect of this Act, see Morse v Muir, Watkins v Reddy, People (Attorney General) v Murtagh, Smith v Smith, Robins v Robins, In re M'Naul's Estate, Morrison v Stubbs and Huffam v North Staffordshire Railway Company.

Section 2 - Application of repealed enactments in local courts
The words "to the court of the county palatine of Lancaster or" in this section were repealed by section 56(4) of, and Part II of Schedule 11 to, the Courts Act 1971. This section was repealed by section 32(4) of, and Part V of Schedule 5 to, the Administration of Justice Act 1977.

Schedule
The Schedule to this Act was repealed by section 1 of, and the Schedule to, the Statute Law Revision Act 1908 (8 Edw 7 c 49).

See also
Statute Law Revision Act

References
Council of Law Reporting. The Law Reports. The Public General Statutes, passed in the fifty-fifth and fifty-sixth years of the Reign of Her Majesty Queen Victoria, 1892. London. 1892. Pages 138 to 267.
The Statutes: Third Revised Edition. HMSO. London. 1950. Volume 12. Page 186 et seq.
"The Statute Law Revision Act, 1892". The Scots Statutes Revised, 1707 to 1900. (The Scots Statutes Revised). William Green & Sons. Edinburgh. 1901. Volume 8. Page 598.
"The Statute Law Revision Act, 1892". Halsbury's Statutes of England. Second Edition. Butterworth & Co (Publishers) Ltd. Bell Yard, Temple Bar, London. 1950. Volume 24. Page 235.
"The Statute Law Revision Act, 1892". Halsbury's Statutes of England. (The Complete Statutes of England). First Edition. Butterworth & Co (Publishers) Ltd. Bell Yard, Temple Bar, London. 1930. Volume 18:  . Page 1011.
John Mounteney Lely. "Statute Law Revision Act, 1892". The Statutes of Practical Utility. (Chitty's Statutes). Fifth Edition. Sweet and Maxwell. Stevens and Sons. London. 1894. Volume 1. Title "Act of Parliament". Pages 32 to 37.
John Mounteney Lely. "Statute Law Revision Act, 1892". Statutes of Practical Utility Passed in the Session of 1892 ending in June. (Continuation of Chitty's Statutes). Sweet and Maxwell. Stevens and Sons. London. August 1892. Pages 384 to 407. See also page iii.
James Sutherland Cotton (ed). "Statute Law Revision Act, 1892". The Practical Statutes of the Session 1892. (Paterson's Practical Statutes). Horace Cox. Windsor House, Bream's Buildings, London. 1892. Pages 117 to 183.
"Obiter Dicta" (1892) 27 The Law Journal 475 at 476
James Roberts, "Statute Law Revision" (1892) 94 The Law Times 18; (1892) 27 The Law Journal 705
"Statute Law Revision Act, 1892" (1892) 11 The Law Notes 300
Thwaites, "Students' Statutes" (1892) 14 The Law Students' Journal 209 at 211 (1 September)
"Irish Statute Law Revision" (1893) 27 Irish Law Times and Solicitors' Journal 239, 240, 249, 250. 
"Statute Law Revision" (1892) 93 The Law Times 55, 80, 149, 170, 179 and 449
Jenks, Geldart, Holdsworth, Lee and Miles. A Digest of English Civil Law. Second Edition. Butterworth & Co. London. 1921. Volume 2. Paragraph 2063 at page 1305.
165 The Law Times 167 (25 February 1928)
Annotated Laws of Palestine. 1944. Volume 1. Page 14.

External links
List of amendments and repeals in the Republic of Ireland from the Irish Statute Book
  ["Note" and "Schedule" of the bill (unlike the schedule of the act as passed) gives commentary on each scheduled act, noting any earlier repeals and the reason for the new repeal]

United Kingdom Acts of Parliament 1892